Greatest Kiss is a greatest hits album by American hard rock band Kiss. It was released in 1997 on Mercury Records.

Background
Along with You Wanted the Best, You Got the Best!!, this album was issued to coincide with the group's 1996–97 Alive/Worldwide Tour. The US version covers only selected hits from 1974 to 1980, with an exclusive live version of "Shout It Out Loud"; the non-US releases include the band's 1992 hit "God Gave Rock 'n' Roll to You II."

Track listings

Produced by Kiss and Eddie Kramer

Note: The Mexican release has the European track listing misprinted on the packaging.

Personnel
Kiss
Paul Stanley – vocals, rhythm guitar, lead guitar on "Sure Know Something", intro guitar solo on "C'mon and Love Me", first guitar solo on "I Want You", 12-string acoustic guitar on "Hard Luck Woman", bass on "Love Gun" and "I Was Made for Lovin' You"
Gene Simmons – vocals, bass; rhythm guitar on "Christine Sixteen"
Peter Criss – drums, vocals
Ace Frehley – lead guitar, second guitar solo on "I Want You", acoustic guitar on "Hard Luck Woman"; vocals, all guitars and bass on "Two Sides of the Coin", "Shock Me" and "2,000 Man"
Bruce Kulick – lead guitar on "God Gave Rock 'n' Roll to You II"
Eric Singer – drums on "God Gave Rock 'n' Roll to You II"
Eric Carr – backing vocals on "God Gave Rock 'n' Roll to You II"

Additional musicians 
Anton Fig – drums on "Sure Know Something", "2,000 Man", "I Was Made for Lovin' You" and "Two Sides of the Coin"
Dick Wagner – acoustic guitar on "Beth"
Bob Ezrin – piano on "Beth"

Charts
 Album

Certifications

References

1997 greatest hits albums
Kiss (band) compilation albums
Mercury Records compilation albums